Jadwiga Bryła (born 9 July 1943 in Warsaw) is a Polish biochemist. Since 1977 manager of Metabolism Regulation Department in Faculty of Biology in Warsaw University, and since 1983 professor in this faculty. Director of Biochemistry Institute. Since 1993 a member-correspondent of Polish Academy of Learning; she leads researches on regulations of intermediate transformations, especially on carbohydrates in animal tissues.

Selections
Book publications
Regulation of cell metabolism Polish Scientific Publishers PWN, (1981).
Journal publications
Drożak J., Doroszewska K., Chodnicka K., Bryła J.Contribution of L-DOPA, dopamine and tyramine metabolism to the inhibition of gluconeogenesis in rabbit kidney-cortex tubules. 29th FEBS Meeting, Warsaw European Journal of Biochemistry Tom 271 Nr supl. 1 r. 2004, pp. 140–140
Kiersztan A., Modzelewska A., Jarzyna R., Jagielska R., Bryła J. Inhibition of gluconeogenesis by vanadium and metformin in kidney-cortex tubules isolated from control and diabetic rabbits Biochemical Pharmacology Tome 63 2002, pp. 1371–1382
Drożak J., Doroszewska R., Chodnicka K., Winiarska K., Bryła J. Contribution of L-3,4-dihydroxyphenylalanine metabolism to the inhibition of gluconeogenesis in rabbit kidney-cortex tubules International Journal of Biochemistry and Cell Biology Tome 37 2005, pp. 1269–1280

References

Polish biochemists
1943 births
Living people
Polish women academics
Academic staff of the Warsaw University of Life Sciences